Defending champion Robin Haase successfully defended his title, defeating Philipp Kohlschreiber in the final, 6–7(2–7), 6–3, 6–2 to win the singles tennis title at the 2012 Bet-at-home Cup Kitzbühel.

Seeds
The top four seeds receive a bye into the second round.

Draw

Finals

Top half

Bottom half

Qualifying

Seeds
The top six seeds receive a bye into the second round.

Qualifiers

Draw

First qualifier

Second qualifier

Third qualifier

Fourth qualifier

References
 Main Draw
 Qualifying Draw

2012 ATP World Tour
2012 Singles